Robert Gabriel Helenius (born 2 January 1984) is a Finnish professional boxer. At regional level, he has held multiple heavyweight championships, including the European title twice between 2011 and 2016. As an amateur, he won a silver medal at the 2006 European Championships. He holds notable wins over former world heavyweight champions Lamon Brewster, Samuel Peter, and Siarhei Liakhovich.

Amateur career
Helenius began training boxing under his father at the mere age of 5. In the early 2000s, Tony Halme was one of Helenius' first sparring / training partner. Helenius won the bronze medal in 2000 at the European "cadets" (U 17) championships in Patras; he lost to Croatian Mario Preskar.
In 2001 at the Junior European Championships in Sarajevo he earned another bronze, losing to hard-hitting Russian Islam Timurziev.

At the 2001 Finnish Amateur Boxing Championships, in the super heavyweight division, Helenius lost to eventual gold medallist Janne Katajisto in the first round. The following year, Katajisto defeated Helenius in the final.

In 2005 at Mianyang Helenius beat David Price on points but then lost to Rustam Saidov.

2006, however, was his breakthrough year.  At the 2006 European Amateur Boxing Championships in Plovdiv he finished second, again beaten by Timurziev, this time on points. By this time all of Helenius's victories had come by knockout including versus Bogdan Dinu.

Since 2006 Helenius has been fighting in Germany in the Box-Bundesliga (Premier League) for Hertha BSC.
Promoter Sauerland-Boxstall had bought an option in case Helenius turned pro after the Olympics. At the Olympic qualifiers he lost to Marko Tomasović and Jaroslavas Jakšto. Helenius also faced MMA heavyweight fighter Sergei Kharitonov in the amateurs, beating him by points.

Professional career
Helenius turned pro in 2008 to fight for Germany's Wilfried Sauerland. In 2009 Helenius knocked out former British heavyweight champion Scott Gammer and defeated Taras Bidenko with a third round stoppage.

Helenius vs. Brewster 

In January 2010 Helenius made the biggest step up so far of his professional career in squaring off against former WBO heavyweight champion Lamon Brewster. Many commentators wondered if the Brewster fight had come too early for the big Finn, however Helenius proved his toughness and punching power by grinding Brewster down to score a brutal TKO in the eighth round. 
Helenius went on to defeat Gbenga Oloukun on 26 March 2010 in Helsinki, despite breaking a bone next to the knuckles of his right hand.

In August 2010 Helenius won the vacant EU heavyweight title against unbeaten Grégory Tony. Helenius defended his title for the first time on 27 November 2010 by beating Attila Levin with a technical knockout in the second round. In the same match he also won the vacant WBO Inter-Continental title.

Helenius vs. Peter
Trying to build on the momentum of his big win over Lamon Brewster, Helenius signed to fight another former world heavyweight champion in Samuel Peter. Peter was coming off a brutal 10th-round knockout loss to unified heavyweight champion Wladimir Klitschko in their marquee rematch bout. The fight took place on 2 April 2011. Peter started the bout aggressively working behind a consistent body and head attack. However, Helenius weathered the storm and soon began to find the mark with his trademark right hand in the middle rounds. As the bout headed into the 9th the score cards were divided, nevertheless Helenius ended matters scoring a brutal knockout leaving Peter out cold on the canvas for well over the 10 second count. On 27 August 2011 Helenius successfully defended his WBO and WBA Inter-Continental titles against Sergei Liakhovich in Munich, Germany, by technical knockout in round 9. It was Helenius' third knockout victory against former heavyweight champions and further cemented his position as one of the world's top ranked heavyweights.

European heavyweight champion
On 3 December 2011, Helenius won the vacant European Championship title (EBU) by beating Derek Chisora by a twelve-round split decision in Helsinki, Finland. The decision was highly debated as most pundits and onlookers thought Chisora had done enough to get the decision. In the Finnish press Helenius claimed he had injured his right arm in the first round of the match, and was thus unable to use it fully. A fracture was found, but it was considered to be minor. The result was widely criticized by the crowd and pundits with Freddie Roach who was commentating the fight labelling it "just terrible" and added 'Helenius was supposed to be the next big thing and the man to challenge the Klitschko's, but Derek totally exposed him and I'm being generous in giving him four winning rounds in the fight'.

The Ring considered the outcome of the match "a gift", dropping Helenius' ranking from fifth to sixth challenger. On the other hand, his slugger fighting style has been described as lazy but powerful; he looks to be not doing much, but keeps putting men down.

The injury required an operation and to achieve complete healing and to minimize any possibility of further injury, a long break from fights. After a year away from boxing, Helenius beat veteran Sherman "The Caribbean Tank" Williams on points on 10 November 2012 in Helsinki keeping his clean record. The fight was the main event on the only Sauerland Events Viasat Nordic Fight Night card so far held outside of Denmark. On 23 March 2013 in Magdeburg, Germany, Helenius won his match against Michael Sprott on points in 10-round match. Helenius broke his right hand wrist in fight.

Due to contract disputes with Team Sauerland, Helenius was inactive for two years, before breaking off the contract with Sauerland in February 2015. Sauerland did not accept the one-sided break of contract and took the issue to the court.

Return to the ring and second European championship
Helenius returned to the ring on 21 March 2015 in Tallinn, when he faced Andras Csomor. On 13 June 2015 Helenius fought against Georgian champion Beka Lobjanidze at Vaasa, Finland. Lobjanidze stood no chance and went to floor in every round before retiring from the fight during the third.

On 19 December 2015, Helenius was supposed to face Erkan Teper for the EBU heavyweight title, but Teper since cancelled the match and had to give up his title due an injury. With Teper pulling out Helenius was matched with replacement opponent undefeated Franz Rill the bout would contest the EBU European heavyweight title vacated by Teper as well as the IBF international heavyweight title. Helenius scored a clear and decisive 12 round unanimous decision; Rill was aggressive but Helenius dominated proceedings with his jab and powerful counter punching sending his opponent to the canvas in both the first and fourth rounds.

On 20 January 2016, Helenius vacated the European belt after refusing to fight mandatory challenger Derek Chisora. Instead, Helenius faced Johann Duhaupas for the vacant WBC Silver Heavyweight title on 2 April in Helsinki. The match ended with Duhaupas knocking Helenius out in the sixth round marking the first loss for previously undefeated Helenius.

On 10 September 2016, Helenius faced German boxer Konstantin Airich in his home town Marienhamn. This was his first fight after the knockout defeat against Duhaupas. Helenius finished the match in the first round knocking Airich out after 49 seconds.

In October 2016 Helenius and Sauerland announced that they had come in terms with their contract dispute from 2015 and would organize at least two more matches together.

On 17 December 2016 Helenius beat Argentinian Gonzalo Basile in 48 seconds in a lackluster scrab at Hartwall Arena, Helsinki.

On 24 March 2017 it was announced that Helenius would get a much awaited rematch against Derek Chisora at the Hartwall Arena in Helsinki, Finland. The same arena they fought at when Helenius won a controversial split decision in December 2011. The bout would have contested for the vacant WBC Silver heavyweight title on 27 May 2017. On 16 May, the fight was however postponed to take place after summer 2017. After Chisora rematch was postponed, Helenius went on to face Russian Evgeny Orlov on 17 June 2017 and did gain an easy victory in 6th round.

Helenius vs. Whyte 
On 15 October 2017, it was announced that Helenius would face Dillian Whyte on 28 October, after Whyte had had a hard time finding an opponent. Whyte controlled the match from the third round on and eventually won by a twelve-round unanimous decision. Helenius commented afterwards that he knew the risks for accepting the match on such fast notice and with only a week of training, but took the risk in a need for money.

Helenius vs. Bykhatsou I 
On 17 March 2018, Helenius faced Yury Bykhautsou in Rakvere, Estonia. Helenius got injured during the match, but ended up winning by an 8-round split decision. Disappointed with his performance during the match, Helenius negotiated a rematch with Bykhautsou for 11 August 2018 in Olavinlinna.

Helenius vs. Bykhatsou II 
Rematch ended with Helenius landing another victory, this time by a unanimous decision.

Helenius vs. Teper 
On 29 September 2018, Helenius faced Erkan Teper for the vacant IBF Inter-Continental heavyweight title. The bout consisted of Helenius controlling most the fight before knocking out Teper in round 8.

Helenius vs. Washington 
After almost a year away from the ring, Helenius made his first appearance in the United States, facing Gerald Washington on 13 July 2019. He lost the bout via knockout in the eighth round.

Helenius vs. Osorio 
On 30 November 2019, Helenius faced Mateus Roberto Osorio in Narva, Estonia. After dropping Osorio in the end of the first round, Helenius went on to knock him out via a body punch in the second round.

Helenius vs. Kownacki 
On 7 March 2020, Helenius squared off against undefeated Adam Kownacki in a WBA title eliminator. While Kownacki was the heavy favorite, Helenius pulled off a significant upset by stopping Kownacki in the fourth round winning the vacant WBA Gold heavyweight title in the process. The victory lined up Helenius as the mandatory challenger for titlist Anthony Joshua. However, Joshua was already set to fight Kubrat Pulev and Kownacki exercised his contractual rematch clause.

Helenius vs. Kownacki II 
According to Helenius' manager, the rematch was postponed several times due to various reasons and ultimately after over a year out of the ring, Helenius returned on 9 October 2021 on the main card of Tyson Fury vs. Deontay Wilder III, against Adam Kownacki. The bout was stopped after six rounds of dominance by Helenius against a clearly overpowered Kownacki. The former had inflicted his opponent with a swollen left eye, before suffering repeated low blows, which caused Kownacki to be disqualified in the sixth round. After the bout, the result was later changed to a technical knockout victory for Helenius.

Helenius vs. Wilder 

Helenius then faced former WBC heavyweight champion Deontay Wilder with the fight scheduled to occur on October 15, 2022 at Brooklyn's Barclays Center. He lost the bout by first round knockout.

Personal life 
Helenius was born in Stockholm, Sweden, and he lived in Sweden until the age of two. He holds both Finnish and Swedish citizenship, and has represented Sweden in a few matches after having a dispute with the Finnish boxing association. Helenius is a Swedish-speaking Finn. Today, Helenius lives in Lumparland municipality in Åland.

Professional boxing record

Television viewership

Germany

Pay-per-view bouts

References

External links

Robert Helenius profile at Finnish Boxing Online  (archived)
Robert Helenius amateur record at Finnish Boxing Online  (archived)
Robert Helenius - Profile, News Archive & Current Rankings at Box.Live

1984 births
Living people
Swedish-speaking Finns
Finnish expatriate sportspeople in Germany
Heavyweight boxers
Sportspeople from Stockholm
European Boxing Union champions
Finnish male boxers
Super-heavyweight boxers
Swedish people of Finnish descent
Swedish male boxers
Swedish expatriate sportspeople in Germany